The 2014 Leeds City Council election took place on Thursday 22 May 2014 to elect members of Leeds City Council in England. It was held on the same day as the 2014 European Parliament election and other local elections across the UK.

As per the election cycle, one third of the council's seats were up for election. The councillors subsequently elected replaced those elected when their individual seats were previously contested in 2010.

The Labour Party had been in overall control of the council since 2011 and their majority was unchanged following this election after winning 20 of the 33 seats contested.

Election summary

This result had the following consequences for the total number of seats on the council after the elections:

Councillors who did not stand for re-election

Ward results

Notes

References

2014 English local elections
2014
2010s in Leeds